The Pirate Party of Israel or Piratim is a political party in Israel founded in 2012 by past members of the Holocaust Survivors and Grown-Up Green Leaf Party and Ale Yarok to promote the values of the international Pirate Party movement. Party candidates gathered 2,076 votes in the 2013 Knesset elections (0.05%), 895 votes (0.02%) in the 2015 elections and 816 votes (0.02%) in the April 2019 Knesset elections.

Election results

References

External links
 Official website

Israel
Political parties in Israel
2012 establishments in Israel
Political parties established in 2012